"Ebony Eyes" is a song written and performed by Bob Welch. The song was the second single release and second hit song from his album French Kiss.  Backing vocals are provided by Juice Newton.

The song reached number 14 on the U.S. Billboard Hot 100, and number 12 on the Cash Box Top 100. In Canada, "Ebony Eyes" peaked at number seven for two weeks. The single was an even bigger success in Australia, where it peaked at number two for four weeks.

Chart performance

Weekly charts

Year-end charts

References

External links
 

1977 songs
1978 singles
Songs written by Bob Welch (musician)
Capitol Records singles
Bob Welch (musician) songs